Sarah Henrietta Leonard, mistakenly referred to in some sources as Everett "Eve" Leonard (21 March 1862 – 5 June 1951), was a British archer.  She competed at the 1908 Summer Olympics in London. Leonard competed at the 1908 Games in the only archery event open to women, the double National round.  She took 21st place in the event with 410 points.

References

External links
 
 
 Sarah Leonard's profile at Sports Reference.com

1862 births
1951 deaths
Archers at the 1908 Summer Olympics
Olympic archers of Great Britain
British female archers